The 1994 California Attorney General election occurred on November 8, 1994. The primary elections took place on March 8, 1994. The Republican incumbent, Dan Lungren, easily defeated the Democratic nominee, Assemblyman Tom Umberg. Every candidate in this race was unopposed in the primary. , this was the last time that a Republican won an election for Attorney General of California.

Election results
Final results from the Secretary of State of California.

Results by county
Results from the Secretary of State of California:

See also
California state elections, 1994
California Attorney General
List of attorneys general of California

References

External links
VoteCircle.com Non-partisan resources & vote sharing network for Californians
Information on the elections from California's Secretary of State

1994 California elections
1994
California